Joseph Tushinsky (1910 in New York City – 1988 in Encino, California) was an American electronics industry pioneer, inventor and musician who co-founded Sony/Superscope Inc. in 1954. He is considered to be "The Father of Stereo". In 1964 Superscope Inc. purchased the Marantz Co., the Audio Electronics mfg. founded by Saul Marantz.

Personal life
Tushinsky was married to Rebecca Del Rio, a Filipina actress. His son, Robert Joseph Tushinsky, is a businessman.

References

External links 
 

1910 births
1988 deaths
20th-century American musicians
20th-century American businesspeople
20th-century American engineers
20th-century American inventors